Rapla Airfield  (also known as Kuusiku Airfield) is an airfield in Estonia. Rapla Airfield is considered one of the centres of Estonian skydiving and private aviation.

Rapla Airfield is used mainly as a drop zone by skydivers, by small airplane and ultra-light owners, by model plane pilots, by hang-glider and glider pilots and by powered para-glider pilots.

References

External links
Official website
Skydive Estonia

Airports in Estonia
Rapla Parish
Buildings and structures in Rapla County
Rapla